Japan  competed at the 2019 World Aquatics Championships in Gwangju, South Korea from 12 to 28 July.

Medalists

Artistic swimming

Japan entered 13 artistic swimmers.

Women

Mixed

 Legend: (R) = Reserve Athlete

Diving

Japan entered seven divers.

Men

Women

Open water swimming

Japan qualified two male and two female open water swimmers.

Men

Women

Mixed

Swimming

Japan entered 25 swimmers.

Men

Women

Mixed

 Legend: (*) = Swimmers who participated in the heat only.

Water polo

Men's tournament

Team roster

Katsuyuki Tanamura
Seiya Adachi
Harukiirario Koppu
Mitsuaki Shiga
Takuma Yoshida
Atsuto Iida
Yusuke Shimizu
Mitsuru Takata
Atsushi Arai
Yusuke Inaba
Keigo Okawa (C)
Kenta Araki
Tomoyoshi Fukushima
Coach: Yoji Omoto

Group D

Playoffs

9th–12th place semifinals

Eleventh place game

Women's tournament

Team roster

Rikako Miura
Yumi Arima
Akari Inaba
Shino Magariyama
Chiaki Sakanoue
Miku Koide
Maiko Hashida
Yuki Niizawa
Minori Yamamoto
Misaki Noro
Marina Tokumoto
Kotori Suzuki (C)
Minami Shioya
Coach: Makihiro Motomiya

Group D

13th–16th place semifinals

13th place game

References

World Aquatics Championships
2019
Nations at the 2019 World Aquatics Championships